Come Morning may refer to:
 Come Morning (album), a 1981 album by Grover Washington Jr.
 Come Morning (film), a 2012 dramatic thriller